Bang Sinu (Hangul: 방신우, Hanja: 方臣祐; 1267 - September 1343), sometimes spelled as Bang Sin-woo or Bang Sin-u, was a eunuch during the late Goryeo dynasty periods. He came from the Sangju Bang clan (상주방씨, 尙州房州) and known for his courtesy name Sogong (Hangul: 소공, Hanja: 小公).

Biography

Early life
Bang Sin-u was born in Jungmohyeon (now become the parts of Sangju-si, Gyeongsangbuk-do) as the son of Bang Deuk-Se (방득세). He later go to Yuan dynasty and in there, he was given a Mongolian name Manggotae (Hangul: 망고태, Hanja: 忙古台).

In Yuan Dynasty and Later life
When attended to Empress Dowager Zhaoxian's banquet?, the mother of Emperor Wuzong of Yuan, he was promoted from Jangjakwonsa (장작원사, 將作院使) to Pyeongjangjeongsa (평장정사, 平章政事). After Wang-Won ascended the throne as the 26th King of Goryeo, Bang later promoted to Byeoksangsamhanjeonggwang (벽상삼한정광, 壁上三韓正匡) because his contribution after make the new King ascended the throne.

In 1310, he returned to Goryeo under the order from the Empress to supervised Geumjajanggyeong (금자장경, 金字藏經). He later moved to Sinhyo Temple (신효사, 神孝寺) to pray for the Empress's blessing and longevity and the authorities were forced to release the prisoners. The new King recognized his dedication and honoured him as Prince Jungmo (중모군, 中牟君) and then married with Lady of the Yi clan (부인 이씨), the daughter of Yi Gwang-Si (이광시), a Gaeseong judge (개성판관, 開城判官). At this time, he served Empress Taejeong (태정황후, 泰定皇后) and get favoured by her, then given title as a Prince Cheomsa (태자첨사, 太子詹事).

Bang participated in national military service while serving 7 lords and 2 empresses. Because of that, it was said if Gangnam District's land with 4000 radish (무, 畝) and there was a lot of wealth accumulated by receiving the grant which was awarded to him. He later go back to Yuan and later died in there in September 1342. His body was returned to Goryeo and was buried in Seonheung Temple (선흥사, 禪興寺) which he had built himself in 1330.

Family
Father: Bang Deuk-Se (방득세)
Grandfather: Bang-Ryang or Bang-Yang (방량 or 방양)
Sister: Lady Bang (방씨)
Brother In-law: Bak-Ryeo (박려)
Nephew: Bak Ji-Jeong (박지정)
Wife: Lady Yi (이씨)
Father In-law: Yi Gwang-Si (이광시)
Son: Bang-Jeol (방절)

In popular culture
Portrayed by Lee Moon-sik in the 2013-2014 MBC TV series Empress Ki.

References

External links

1267 births
1343 deaths
14th-century Korean people